Brandon Paul Flynn (born October 11, 1993) is an American actor, known for his role as Justin Foley in the Netflix series 13 Reasons Why (2017–2020), as well as appearing as himself in the short film Home Movies, and Mike the Intern in BrainDead (2016). He also appeared in the series Ratched (2020) and the horror movie Hellraiser (2022).

Early life 
Flynn was born and raised in Miami, Florida, where he attended high school at New World School of the Arts. He graduated from the Mason Gross School of the Arts at Rutgers University in New Jersey in 2016, with a bachelor's degree in Fine Arts. Flynn's first role was at the age of ten, playing Mr. Smee in a musical version of Peter Pan.

Career 
In 2016, Flynn was cast as Mike the Intern in BrainDead, and in 2017, he played Luke in the off-Broadway production of John Kander and Greg Pierce's musical Kid Victory at the Vineyard Theatre. Unlike the rest of the characters in the show, his character does not sing.

Prior to these roles, Flynn had acted in various commercials and films, playing a reporter for CWW's "FL Kidcare Health," the principal on Sirens and Sid on Lost and Gone Forever. Flynn has also acted in 11 plays, including Much Ado About Nothing and The Crucible.

In February 2018, he joined the third season of True Detective as Ryan Peters in a recurring capacity. From 2017 to 2020, Flynn portrayed Justin Foley in the Netflix series 13 Reasons Why. In 2020, Flynn made his feature film acting debut in the dark indie comedy Looks That Kill, starring as a high school student whose physical appearance causes the death of anyone who looks at him. In the same year, he had a recurring role as Henry Osgood in the 2020 television series Ratched.

Personal life 
Flynn is openly gay. He is Jewish.

Filmography

Films

Television

Music videos

References

External links
 

1993 births
21st-century American male actors
American male film actors
American male television actors
Jewish American male actors
LGBT Jews
American gay actors
LGBT people from Florida
Living people
Male actors from Miami
Mason Gross School of the Arts alumni
Rutgers University alumni
21st-century American Jews
21st-century LGBT people
Jewish actors